Stelle may refer to:

Places
 Stelle (Germany)
 Stelle, Illinois

People
 Charles C. Stelle (1910–1964), a United States diplomat
 Christian Delle Stelle (b. 1989), an Italian professional racing cyclist
 Helen Virginia Stelle (1884–1947), first director of the Tampa Free Library
 John Henry Stelle (1891–1962), U.S. political figure
 Michael Dalle Stelle (b. 1990), an Italian racing driver

See also
 Stele, a type of religious monument